Sumdorong Chu
is a tributary of the Nyamjang Chu river that flows along the disputed Sino-Indian border between the Tsona County of Tibet and the Tawang district of Arunachal Pradesh.  It originates in the Tokpo Shiri Glacier, about 7–10 kilometres east of Nyamjang Chu, and flows down to the river.
Its junction with Nyamjang Chu is to the north of that of Namka Chu, another contested river valley, by about two kilometers.

The Sumdorong Chu valley was the site of a standoff between India and China in 1986–1987 which, despite giving rise to the fears of another war, got deescalated successfully. Subsequently, India and China formulated agreements for managing future border tensions.

Location 
Sumdorong Chu flows in a disputed border region between Tibet's Tsona County and Arunachal Pradesh's Tawang district. The dispute arises due to differing interpretations of where the McMahon Line lies.

China adheres to the 1914 map of the McMahon Line, which shows the border as a straight line at 27°44'30" N latitude till the range of "Menlakathong La" (roughly the modern Bum La Pass).
India believes that the true border lies along the highest watershed line in the region, which is to the north of the Namka Chu and Sumdorong Chu streams.

1987 standoff 

In 1986–87, a military standoff took in the Sumdorong Chu Valley. It was initiated by China moving a company of troops to Wangdung, a pasture to the south of Sumdorong Chu which India held to be part of its territory. The Indian troops stood their ground on the neighbouring Lungro la ridge and both the sides moved a large number of troops to the border. The crisis was diffused after the visit of Indian Foreign Minister to Beijing in May 1987.

See also
 Namka Chu
 McMahon Line

References

Bibliography

China–India border
Rivers of Arunachal Pradesh
Rivers of Tibet
Shannan, Tibet
Tawang district
Territorial disputes of China
Territorial disputes of India
Borders of Arunachal Pradesh